La Villa Santo Sospir (1952) is a 35-minute amateur or home film directed by Jean Cocteau in which Cocteau takes the viewer on a tour of Francine Weisweiller's villa on the French coast, a major location later used in his film Testament of Orpheus (1960).

The house itself is heavily decorated, mostly by Cocteau (and a bit by Picasso), and we are given an extensive tour of the artwork. Cocteau also shows us several dozen paintings, most of which cover mythological themes. He also proudly shows paintings by Edouard Dermit and Jean Marais and plays around his own home in Villefranche.

External links 
 Film at Ubuweb film
 
 Official site

French short films
1952 films
1950s French-language films
Films directed by Jean Cocteau
French documentary films
1952 documentary films
Documentary films about the visual arts
1950s French films